Marathon Oil Tower is a skyscraper in Uptown Houston. The building rises  in height. It contains 41 floors, and was completed in 1983 and construction only took 22 months. First City Tower currently stands as the 20th-tallest building in the city. The architectural firm who designed the building was Pierce Goodwin Alexander & Linville.

Tenants
The building is named for American petroleum and natural gas exploration company Marathon Oil, which is headquartered in it. In addition Aon Corporation has its Houston offices in the tower.

See also

List of tallest buildings in Houston
List of tallest buildings in Texas
Architecture of Houston

References

External links
Image of Marathon Oil Tower on Emporis

Skyscraper office buildings in Houston
Office buildings completed in 1983
Modernist architecture in Texas